Mia Xitlali Tenorio (Seet-la-lee; born July 29, 1999), known professionally as Mia Xitlali, is an American actress and singer best known for the 2015 feature film Max.

Personal life
Xitlali was born in Los Angeles, California, the daughter of performers. Her father is from El Paso, Texas, while her mother is Mexican (from Guadalajara). She started acting at the age of seven and knew she wanted to be an actress after performing in the musical South Pacific at the Hollywood Bowl.

Career
After working on the short film Selling Rosario, Xitlali was given the opportunity to work with Boaz Yakin on his movie Max. She is currently still working in theater.

Filmography

References

External links 
 
 

American actresses of Mexican descent
Hispanic and Latino American actresses
Actresses from Los Angeles
Living people
1999 births
21st-century American women